Ampatuan is a surname. Notable people with the surname include:

Andal Ampatuan Sr., former Governor of Maguindanao province, the Philippines, and co-suspect in the Maguindanao massacre
Andal Ampatuan Jr., former Mayor of Datu Unsay, Maguindanao province, and primary suspect in the Maguindanao Massacre
Zaldy Ampatuan (b. 1967), former Governor of the Autonomous Region in Muslim Mindanao (ARMM) in the Philippines

See also
Ampatuan, Maguindanao, municipality in the Philippines